Shabur (Shabar) is a rural locality (a selo) in Zaigrayevsky District, Republic of Buryatia, Russia. The population was 1,235 as of 2010. There are 9 streets.

Geography 
Shabur is located 56 km south of Zaigrayevo (the district's administrative centre) by road. Tsagan-Daban is the nearest rural locality.

References 

Rural localities in Zaigrayevsky District